Mount Kynoch is a rural locality in the Toowoomba Region, Queensland, Australia.

Geography

The Great Dividing Range passes through the east of the locality with the mountain Mount Kynoch the only named peak within the locality.

The Main Line railway forms the eastern boundary of the locality with Rangeview railway station serving the locality.

The New England Highway enters the locality from the south (Harlaxton) and exits to the north (Blue Mountain Heights). The Toowoomba Bypass enters the locality from the south-east (Ballard), passes under the New England Highway (they do not intersect), and exits the locality to the south (Harlaxton).

History 
Originally the name Kynoch was used for a trigonometric station on the mountain originally known as Stony Pinch. Later both the mountain and the locality were named Mount Kynoch after John Kynoch, an early chairman of the Shire of Highfields.

Education 
There are no schools in Mount Kynoch. The nearest primary schools are Harlaxton and Highfields. The nearest secondary schools are Toowoomba State High School in Mount Lofty and Wilsonton State High School in Wilsonton Heights.

Facilities 
Mount Kynoch Water Treatment Plant is on the top of Mount Kynoch, accessed via Shuttlewood Court. It draws its water from Cooby Dam, Cressbrook Dam and Perseverance Dam.

Amenities
There are a number of parks in the area:
 Hillsdale Cresent Road Park
 Shuttlewood Court Park

Attractions 
There are two lookouts in Mount Kynoch on either side of the New England Highway. The northbound lookout is on Shuttlewood Court beside the water treatment plant and has picnic and park facilities.

References

Toowoomba Region
Localities in Queensland